A mass shooting occurred at an ABB power plant in St Louis, Missouri, on January 7, 2010. An ABB Power employee, armed with multiple firearms, killed three and injured five others (two critically) and killed himself before police arrived.

Shooting
Timothy Hendron arrived at work with an AK-47-type semi-automatic, at least two Hi-Point handguns, a pump-action shotgun, and hundreds of rounds of ammunition.

The shootings began around 6:30 a.m. local time, when Hendron opened fire in a parking lot near the factory before moving inside. The first 911 call came in around 6:45 a.m., saying that a gunman was moving about the complex and that he had shot several people. Hendron fired about 100 rounds of ammunition, killing two people in the parking lot and another person inside the factory before killing himself.

Five people were injured in the incident, including two in critical condition. Two more were in fair condition, and the fifth person injured had been admitted to a hospital and released. Other employees took refuge on the roof of the building or in offices within the factory. During the shooting, an employee at the facility retrieved a handgun from his car and was injured while returning fire when the gunman was moving down the hall towards a group of workers who were hiding in a break room.

Victims
The following were killed in the shooting:

Carlton Carter, 57
Terry Mabry, 55
Cory Wilson, 27

Perpetrator
Police identified the shooter as 51-year-old Timothy Gerard Hendron (August 2, 1958 — January 7, 2010), a resident of Webster Groves, Missouri, a suburb of St. Louis, and an employee of ABB. No motive has been identified, though he was known to be part of a class action lawsuit against ABB pertaining to the company's pension plan, specifically unidentified fees and expenses in employees' 401(k) accounts. People who knew Hendron said that he had been increasingly unhappy with his job at ABB, going so far as to search for a labor lawyer.

Aftermath
Police later found a third handgun near a guard shack. The day after the shootings, ABB released a statement mourning the deaths of its employees, including a quote from its CEO, Joe Hogan, saying in part, "I am deeply saddened by this news and would like to express my greatest sympathy to those who have been touched by this tragedy."

See also
Kirkwood City Council shooting, a similar case involving a suspect in a neighboring community.

References

External links
ABB statement

2010 active shooter incidents in the United States
Murder in Missouri
2010 murders in the United States
2010 mass shootings in the United States
Mass shootings in the United States
Deaths by firearm in Missouri
Murder–suicides in Missouri
2010s in St. Louis
2010 in Missouri
Workplace shootings in the United States
Crimes in Missouri
Attacks in the United States in 2010
January 2010 crimes in the United States
Mass shootings in Missouri